Land court or land claims court is a type of court which is charged with dealings over cases involving land titles and for disputes between landlords and tenants relating to agricultural tenancies. The exact field of jurisdiction varies by country.

Africa

The Land Claims Court of the Republic of South Africa was established in 1995 and has the same status as the High Courts of that country. The court specializes in hearing disputes that arise out of laws that underpin South Africa's land reform initiative.  These are the Restitution of Land Rights Act, 1994, the Land Reform (Labour Tenants) Act, 1996 and the Extension of Security of Tenure Act, 1997. This is in line with the South African Constitution which gave people and communities who had been dispossessed of land after 19 June 1913 as a result of racially discriminatory laws or practices the right to restitution of that property or to fair compensation. The Court also fulfils an important function in reviewing certain decisions of inferior courts.

Americas
Dominican Land Court, see Politics of the Dominican Republic#Judicial branch
Hawaii Land Court
Massachusetts Land Court
Virginia Land Court Commission
United States Court of Private Land Claims (1891–1904)

Asia
Land Court of colonial Hong Kong
Land Court of the Mandatory Palestine#Land ownership
Philippine Court of Land Registration (1903–1914), see Land Registration Authority (Philippines)#History

Europe
Land Courts of Austria
Land Arbitration Court of the Irish Republic, see Dáil Courts
Irish Land Courts, see Irish Land Acts (see also Irish Land Commission)
Scottish Land Court
Manx Land Court, part of the judiciary of the Isle of Man
Land Court of Moravia#History

Oceania
Land Court of New South Wales (1889–1921), Australia
Land and Environment Court of New South Wales (1980–), Australia
Land and Valuation Court of New South Wales (1921–1980), Australia
Queensland Land Court, Australia
Native Land Court (1865–1964), New Zealand
Māori Land Court (1964–), New Zealand
Land Court of Palau, see Politics of Palau#Judicial branch
Tongan Land Court, see Politics of Tonga#Judicial branch

See also
Land law
Land registration
Land Office

References

Courts by type
Real property law